Viktor Sergeyevich Aleksandrov (born 14 February 2002) is a Russian football player who plays as a centre-back for FC Pari Nizhny Novgorod.

Club career
Aleksandrov was raised in the academy of FC Rubin Kazan and was first registered for the club's league squad in the 2018–19 season, and first appeared as a substitute on the matchday squad in November 2020. For the 2021 season, he joined Latvian Higher League side Valmiera FC on loan, and made his senior debut there.

On 15 February 2022, Aleksandrov was loaned to Russian Premier League side FC Nizhny Novgorod from his home town until the end of 2022, with an option to purchase. He made his RPL debut for Nizhny Novgorod on 26 February 2022 in a game against FC Ural Yekaterinburg, as a starter.

On 30 December 2022, Aleksandrov moved to Pari NN (the club was renamed since his original move) on a permanent basis and signed a four-year contract with the club.

Career statistics

References

External links
 
 
 

2002 births
Sportspeople from Nizhny Novgorod
Living people
Russian footballers
Russia youth international footballers
Russia under-21 international footballers
Association football defenders
FC Rubin Kazan players
Valmieras FK players
FC Nizhny Novgorod (2015) players
Latvian Higher League players
Russian Premier League players
Russian expatriate footballers
Expatriate footballers in Latvia
Russian expatriate sportspeople in Latvia